This list of tallest buildings in Shenyang ranks skyscrapers in Shenyang, in Liaoning, China by height. The city is currently undergoing a large building boom with many skyscrapers slated to be completed in the coming years.

Shenyang is the capital and a sub-provincial city of Liaoning Province; with a total urban population of 5.7 million, it is the biggest city in Northeast China.

Tallest Buildings
This lists ranks Shenyang skyscrapers that stand at least 150 m (490 ft) tall, based on standard height measurement. This includes spires and architectural details but does not include antenna masts. Existing structures are included for ranking purposes based on present height.

Under Construction

Proposed

References

External links
 Skyscrapers of Shenyang on Skycraperpage.com 
 Skyscrapers of Shenyang on Emporis.com
 Skyscrapers of Shenyang on Gaoloumi (in Chinese)

Shenyang
Skyscrapers in Shenyang